Metropolitan Panteleimon (born Nikolaos Kontoyiannis, ; 7 February 1935 – 24 January 2023) was the Metropolitan of Belgium and Exarch of the Netherlands and Luxembourg, under the spiritual leadership of the Ecumenical Patriarchate of Constantinople. He retired in 2013.

Panteleimon was born in Chios, Greece on 7 February 1935. He was a graduate of the Theological Institute of Halki seminary, Istanbul. In 1982, he was unanimously elected by the Holy Synod of the Ecumenical Patriarchate as the Head of the Holy Greek Orthodox Metropolis of Belgium, based in Brussels.

Metropolitan Panteleimon died on 24 January 2023, at the age of 87.

References

Literature
 

1935 births
2023 deaths
Bishops of the Ecumenical Patriarchate of Constantinople
Eastern Orthodox bishops in Europe
Eastern Orthodoxy in Belgium
Eastern Orthodoxy in the Netherlands
Eastern Orthodoxy in Luxembourg
Eastern Orthodox Christians from Greece
Theological School of Halki alumni
Bishops in Belgium
Clergy from Chios